John Hitchens (born 1940) is an English painter. His work is influenced by the landscape of the South Downs and his main subject area is the countryside of West Sussex, England. He also spent extended periods working in North Wales and North West Scotland. Hitchens' paintings are primarily concerned with expressing patterns and textures of the landscape. During the past decades his work has evolved into an abstract style using a range of earth colours.

Biography
John Hitchens was born in Hove, Sussex, England. Both his father, Ivon Hitchens (1893 – 1979) and his grandfather Alfred Hitchens (1861-1942) were also painters. He attended Bedales School near Petersfield, Hampshire, and studied at the Academy of Art, Corsham. Hitchens started exhibiting in the 1960s with a series of solo exhibitions, notably with the Marjorie Parr Gallery in London. His work is represented in several public and private collections in England and overseas.

He lives near Petworth, West Sussex and works at the studio his father built in the woods.

In March 2020 Southampton City Art Gallery mounted a major retrospective of John Hitchens' paintings, covering more than five decades of his work.

Exhibitions featuring work by John Hitchens, his father Ivon, his grandfather Alfred, and his son Simon, a sculptor, were held at Kevis House Gallery in Petworth in 2019 and at Southampton City Art Gallery in 2022/3.

Work in public and private collections
Bradford City Art Gallery
Brighton Museum & Art Gallery
Brasenose College, Oxford
New College, Oxford. 
Ferens Art Gallery, Hull
Magdalene College, Cambridge
Nuffield College, Oxford
University of Chichester
Towner Gallery, Eastbourne
Leicester University
Southampton City Art Gallery
Chippenham Museum and Art Collection

References

Further reading
 Artists in Britain since 1945, Sansom & Company, 2006 
 Marjorie Parr - Chelsea and St Ives Art Dealer, Old Bakehouse Publications, 2008 
 Circles and Tangents: Art in the shadow of Cranborne Chase, Canterton Books, 2011 
 John Hitchens - Aspects of Landscape, contributor Anne-Katrin Purkiss, Sansom & Company, 2020 
 South Downs Showcase, Lodsworth Heritage Society, 2021 
 Convergence - Paintings by John Hitchens, Felix & Spear Gallery, 2022 
 The Art of Chichester, 60 Years, York House Books, 2022

External links
 
 
 Publications at the National Art Library 
 Felix & Spear Gallery
 From Sombre Lands: Piano Composition after a painting by John Hitchens (2013)
 www.artnet.com
 Christies Auctions past results for John Hitchens

1940 births
Living people
20th-century English painters
English male painters
21st-century English painters
21st-century English male artists
Rother Valley artists
20th-century English male artists